Frank Bielby (fourth ¼ 1897 – 1980) was an English professional rugby league footballer who played in the 1910s, 1920s and 1930s.

Playing career

Challenge Cup Final appearances
Frank Bielby played right-, i.e. number 12, in the Hull Kingston Rovers' 3–16 defeat by Oldham in the 1924–25 Challenge Cup Final during the 1924–25 season at Headingley Rugby Stadium, Leeds on Saturday 25 April 1925, in front of a crowd of 28,335.

Club career
Frank Bielby made his début (as did Gilbert Austin) playing  for the Hull Kingston Rovers, and scored a try in the 22–10 victory over Wakefield Trinity at Craven Street, Kingston upon Hull Saturday 25 January 1919, he played and scored a try in the 7–6 victory over Leeds in the 1924–25 Challenge Cup semi-final during the 1924–25 season at Belle Vue, Wakefield, he played his last match for the Hull Kingston Rovers in the 0–19 defeat by Bradford Northern at Odsal Stadium, Bradford on Sunday 19 February 1928, he was transferred from Hull Kingston Rovers to York (as did forward; Frank Boagey), he retired from playing rugby league 2-years later, he then became a gateman at the Hull Kingston Rovers.

Testimonial match
A joint benefit season/testimonial match at Hull Kingston Rovers during the 1927–28 season was shared by; Gilbert Austin and Frank Bielby, during May 1928 each player received £81 9s 7d (based on increases in average earnings, this would be approximately £25,480 in 2017).

References

External links
Search for "Bielby" at rugbyleagueproject.org
Search for "Frank Bielby" at britishnewspaperarchive.co.uk

1897 births
1980 deaths
English rugby league players
Hull Kingston Rovers players
Place of death missing
Rugby league centres
Rugby league players from Yorkshire
Rugby league second-rows
Rugby league wingers
Sportspeople from Beverley
York Wasps players